Edmond J. Safra Synagogue can refer to:
Edmond J. Safra Synagogue (Brooklyn): A synagogue under construction in Brooklyn along Ocean Parkway & Avenue U.
Edmond J. Safra Synagogue (Manhattan): A synagogue located along 63rd Street in Manhattan near Central Park.

Disambiguation pages